Jens Toornstra (born 4 April 1989) is a Dutch professional footballer who plays for Eredivisie side FC Utrecht. He usually plays as an attacking midfielder.

Club career

Early career
Toornstra was born in Ter Aar. In his youth, he played eight years for amateur football club Alphense Boys in the Tweede Klasse C. In his last year he scored 20 goals for the team. He impressed so much Kees Jansma recommended Toornstra to ADO Den Haag. Initially, the scouts of ADO Den Haag did not believe Toornstra would be as good but ADO Den Haag bought Toornstra for the reserve squad.

ADO Den Haag
In the summer of 2009 Toornstra came to ADO Den Haag with a contract until July 2012. He made his debut in the 3–0 victory against Willem II. Soon, he became first team player for ADO and quickly gained interests from AZ, FC Twente and Roda JC. Toornstra signed a new improved contract on 4 July that same year until the summer of 2013.

In the 2010–11 season Toornstra received the jersey number 7, last worn by Karim Soltani who moved to Iraklis Thessaloniki F.C. He scored his first goal for ADO Den Haag in January against Excelsior after missing not a single game. On 26 May 2011, He scored a hat-trick against Groningen in the first leg of their Europa League semi-final. His goals helped Den Haag to a 5–1 lead on aggregate.

Utrecht
At the end of the winter transfer window, Toornstra signed with FC Utrecht. He grew out to be one of the important players.

Feyenoord
On 25 August 2014, Toornstra made a transfer to Feyenoord for a fee of €3.5 million. He signed a four-year deal.

On 22 April 2018, he scored as Feyenoord won the 2017–18 KNVB Cup final 3–0 against AZ Alkmaar.

International
On 13 May 2010, Toornstra got his first election for the Netherlands under-21 national team for the games against Portugal on 18 and 21 May. He instantly played his first match on 18 May. He scored his first goal for the U-21 team on 11 August 2010 against Liechtenstein.

In May 2013 Toornstra was part of the Netherlands national team's tour of Asia, with friendly matches against China and Indonesia. He made his debut against Indonesia.

Career statistics

Club

International

Honours
Feyenoord
 Eredivisie: 2016–17
 KNVB Cup: 2015–16, 2017–18
Johan Cruyff Shield: 2017, 2018
 UEFA Europa Conference League runner-up: 2021–22

References

External links
 
 Voetbal International profile 

1989 births
Living people
People from Leiderdorp
Dutch footballers
Footballers from South Holland
Association football midfielders
Netherlands international footballers
Netherlands under-21 international footballers
Eredivisie players
Alphense Boys players
ADO Den Haag players
FC Utrecht players
Feyenoord players